Szary is a Polish surname. Notable people with the surname include:

 Sebastian Szary (born 1975), German musician
 Sławomir Szary (born 1979), Polish footballer

See also
 
 Shary (disambiguation)

Polish-language surnames
Surnames from nicknames